Arthur L. Herman (born 1956) is an American popular historian. He currently serves as a senior fellow at Hudson Institute.

Biography
Herman's father Arthur L. Herman, a scholar of Sanskrit, was a professor of philosophy at the University of Wisconsin-Stevens Point.

Herman received his B.A. from the University of Minnesota and M.A. and Ph.D. in history from Johns Hopkins University. He spent a semester abroad at The University of Edinburgh in Scotland. His 1984 dissertation research dealt with the political thought of early-17th-century French Huguenots.

In the late 1980s and early 1990s, Herman taught at Sewanee: The University of the South, George Mason University, Georgetown and The Catholic University of America. He was the founder and coordinator of the Western Heritage Program in the Smithsonian's Campus on the Mall lecture series.

His 2001 book on the Scottish Enlightenment, How the Scots Invented the Modern World, was a New York Times bestseller.

In 2008, he added to his body of work Gandhi and Churchill: The Epic Rivalry that Destroyed an Empire and Forged Our Age, a finalist for the 2009 Pulitzer Prize for General Nonfiction.

In 1987, Herman married Beth Marla Warshofsky. He lives in Washington, D.C.

Views
Herman generally employs the Great Man perspective in his work, which is 19th-century historical methodology attributing human events and their outcomes to the singular efforts of great men that has been refined and qualified by such modern thinkers as Sidney Hook.

He did not join the ranks of the so-called declinists after examining the works of Friedrich Nietzsche, Michel Foucault, Henry Adams, Brooks Adams, Oswald Spengler, and Arnold Toynbee, who expressed pessimism about the fate of the West, and remains cautiously optimistic about the future of the Western civilization.

He argues that after passing through the critical era of rapid geopolitical changes in the 20th century driven by an "ideological fervor to transform humanity and create a more perfect world order", the world finally entered in the 21st century into an era of relative stability "defined by the balance-of-power geopolitics."

Herman advocates embracing the U.S. history in its entirety, including the American Civil War, rather than sanitizing it after the fact: "America is a country where the process of conflict and reconciliation, combined with the passage of time, brings out and embeds the qualities that make the United States one people and one community."

Works

 The Idea Of Decline In Western History, Free Press, 1997 .
 Joseph McCarthy: Reexamining the Life and Legacy of America's Most Hated Senator, Free Press, 1999 .
 How the Scots Invented the Modern World: The True Story of How Western Europe's Poorest Nation Created Our World and Everything in It, Three Rivers Press 2002 .
 To Rule the Waves: How the British Navy Shaped the Modern World, HarperCollins, 2004 .
 Gandhi and Churchill:The Epic Rivalry that Destroyed an Empire and Forged Our Age, Bantam, 2008 .
 Freedom's Forge: How American Business produced victory in World War II, 2012 
 
 Douglas MacArthur: American Warrior, Random House, 2016 .
 
 The Viking Heart: How Scandinavians Conquered the World, Houghton Mifflin Harcourt, 2021

References

External links
 
 Booknotes interview with Herman on Joseph McCarthy: Reexamining the Life and Legacy of America's Most Hated Senator, February 6, 2000.
 C-SPAN Q&A interview with Herman talking about his book, Douglas MacArthur: American Warrior, May 24, 2016.
 Biographical profile, Hudson Institute.
 Guide to the Arthur Herman papers, 1950–1999, George Mason Universities Libraries

1956 births
21st-century American historians
21st-century American male writers
Living people
Smithsonian Institution people
Johns Hopkins University alumni
Catholic University of America faculty
Georgetown University faculty
George Mason University faculty
Hudson Institute
American male non-fiction writers